Curtis Benton Welch (February 10, 1862 – August 29, 1896) was a Major League Baseball center fielder for the Toledo Blue Stockings, St. Louis Browns, Philadelphia Athletics, Baltimore Orioles, Cincinnati Reds, and Louisville Colonels.

Career
Welch started his professional baseball career in 1883 with Toledo of the Northwestern League and stayed with the club when it moved to the American Association the following year. In 1885, he joined the St. Louis Browns (today's Cardinals). Welch scored the series-winning run in extra innings of game 6 of the 1886 World Series in a close play at the plate famous among baseball fans of his generation as the "$15,000 slide."

After three seasons with St. Louis, Welch went to Philadelphia and had a career-high .282 batting average in 1888. He played for the Athletics until 1890 and then had short stints with the Orioles, Reds, and Colonels. His major league career ended in 1893, and he spent the next two seasons with the Eastern League's Syracuse Stars.

Welch led the AA in hit by pitches in 1888, 1890, and 1891, and he ranked third in stolen bases in 1886 and 1888. He was regarded as one of the best defensive center fielders of the 19th century. In the 2010 book The New Bill James Historical Baseball Abstract, Bill James ranked Welch as the 83rd greatest center fielder of all-time.

Welch sometimes kept a case of beer in the outfield behind a billboard, taking a drink between innings. Welch's career was damaged by his drinking, and he died in 1896.

See also
 List of Major League Baseball annual doubles leaders
 List of Major League Baseball career stolen bases leaders

References

External links

1862 births
1896 deaths
19th-century baseball players
Major League Baseball center fielders
Baseball players from Ohio
Toledo Blue Stockings players
St. Louis Browns (AA) players
Philadelphia Athletics (AA) players
Baltimore Orioles players
Cincinnati Reds players
Louisville Colonels players
Toledo Blue Stockings (minor league) players
East Liverpool East End All Stars players
Syracuse Stars (minor league baseball) players
Carbondale Anthracites players
People from East Liverpool, Ohio